Dale Zieroth (born November 7, 1946 in Neepawa, Manitoba) is a Canadian poet. He won the Dorothy Livesay Poetry Prize in 1999 for How I Joined Humanity at Last, and the Governor General's Award for English language poetry in 2009 for The Fly in Autumn.

Works
1973:Clearing: Poems from a Journey 
1981:Mid-River
1985:When the Stones Fly Up 
1991:The Weight of My Raggedy Skin 
1998:How I Joined Humanity at Last 
2001:Crows Do Not Have Retirement 
2002:The Education of Mr Whippoorwill: A Country Boyhood 
2006:The Village of Sliding Time
2009:The Fly in Autumn

References

External links
David Zieroth

1946 births
Governor General's Award-winning poets
People from Neepawa, Manitoba
Writers from Manitoba
Living people
20th-century Canadian poets
Canadian male poets
21st-century Canadian poets
20th-century Canadian male writers
21st-century Canadian male writers